Cebreros is a municipality of Spain, located in the province of Ávila, part of the autonomous community of Castile and León. As of 2018 it had a population of 3,056. The municipality covers an area of 137.47 km2. It lies at 755 metres above sea level. Located in the east of the province, bordering the Community of Madrid, the Alberche River runs through the south of the municipality.

Cebreros hosts the Deep Space Antenna 2, an ESTRACK station for communication with spacecraft for the European Space Agency (ESA).

Cebreros is known for being the birthplace of Adolfo Suárez, Prime Minister and leading figure of the Spanish transition. The local football team is CD Cebrereña.

References

Further reading 
 

Municipalities in the Province of Ávila